Grayson is a 2014–2016 spy comic book ongoing series published by DC Comics about the character Dick Grayson leaving behind his superhero life to become an agent of the fictional spy agency Spyral. The series was initially written by Tim Seeley and Tom King, with art by Mikel Janín and Stephen Mooney. The creative team departed the series after issue #17, with Seeley working on Nightwing and King & Janín on Batman for the impending DC Rebirth relaunch; from issue #18 onwards, the series was written by Jackson Lanzing and Collin Kelly with art by Roge Antonio.

Publication history
The Grayson series follows the events of the Forever Evil crossover event which ran from September 2013 to May 2014. During the story, the Crime Syndicate publicly unmask Nightwing as Dick Grayson following which he is seemingly killed. Although revived, Batman and Dick realize that he can no longer operate as Nightwing and must maintain the façade of being dead.

The first issue was released on July 2, 2014 following the conclusion of the then-current Nightwing run, which ended at issue #30 on May 24.

Plot
Following his supposed death, Batman sends Dick Grayson undercover to investigate Spyral, a clandestine organization founded by Kathy Kane to spy on superheroes. Grayson is given numbered as Agent 37 and is partnered with senior Spyral agent Helena Bertinelli, codenamed Matron. The duo are sent on missions by Spyral's enigmatic leader Mr. Minos to retrieve body parts from the recently deceased supervillain Paragon which are being traded and distributed among criminals in order to give them powers. Tension arises between the two when Grayson's refusal to kill costs the lives of other agents. During a mission, Dick fights against Midnighter who is also keeping an eye on Spyral, causing him to question the organizations purpose and motives even more. While Grayson and Bertinelli are busy with these missions, Minos, who obscures his face using nanobot technology, secretly uses Spyral's resources to uncover the secret identities of superheroes. Grayson communicates with Batman in secret using code in order to discuss his findings and, although he expresses concerns over his safety, Dick convinces Batman that he needs to stay undercover to find out what Spyral are really planning.

Grayson and Matron continue searching for Paragon's organs, coming into frequent conflict with Midnighter, who is trying to keep them out of Spyral's possession and has discovered that Agent 37 is actually Dick. A cult known as the Fist of Cain manage to acquire Paragon's brain and intend to use it to unleash a psychic pulse at an Israeli peace rally, killing thousands but Grayson convinces Midnighter that they are on the same side and they successfully team up to stop them. Minos meets with Helena and shoots her with her crossbow, leading her to play dead until he leaves before making her way to Dick. Helena explains that all Spyral operatives are on missions aside from Agent 1, codenamed Tiger, and theorizes that Minos will try to kill him next. Grayson and Tiger team up to fight Minos, who has used the organs to create a new version of Paragon that has the powers of the Justice League. Using Dick's knowledge of the League, they are able to defeat Paragon but find that Mr. Minos has escaped. In an unknown location, Minos holds a meeting with a reporter, revealing the identities of several superheroes and explaining that he joined Syral so that he could leak their secrets. The reporter, revealed to be Agent Zero, chastises Minos and kills him.

Following Minos' death, Matron takes over as the new director of Spyral and is confronted by the heads of several other spy agencies who inform her that, on each of Agent 37's five previous missions, one of their own agents has been murdered with escrima sticks. Helena is suspicious, knowing that Grayson would never kill, and assumes he is being set up. Dick attempts to contact Batman, asking when he is able to come home but receives no reply, causing him to act recklessly during a mission with Tiger to steal a necklace made of kryptonite. Dick begins to question Helena's true motivations when he discovers that he is supposed to hand the necklace to Lex Luthor and he flees. Tiger is attacked by someone who looks identical to Dick but is saved from being murdered by the real Dick, who initially believes his attacker to be Clayface in disguise. The two Graysons fight but Dick is bested when the attacker distracts him by playing off his isolation from his family. Tiger regains consciousness and rips the nanobots out of his eyes, discovering that the attacker is his old partner Agent 8, whom he believed dead. Tiger lies about the identity of the attacker, blaming Maxwell Lord and Checkmate while Dick, after another failed attempt to reach Batman, quits Sypral and heads for Gotham City. His reunion with Batman, who has lost his memory, is interrupted by Agent Zero, who demands he return to Spyral or they will reveal Batman's secret identity. Dick meets with Jason, Tim, Barbara and Damian, with each reacting in various ways to the fact that he is alive. Knowing Spyral will be watching, he communicates with them in code and tasks them with hacking into the nanobots so that he will no longer be under Spyral's control.

Upon his return to Spyral, Helena reassures Dick that she knew he was innocent whereas Tiger's relationship with Dick remains strained. Tim confirms the identity of Agent Zero as Luka Netz, a woman who he discovers has been watching Batman and Dick (as Robin) for years. Pinpointing her location to Berlin, Dick and Midnighter orchestrate a mission causing Sypral to send him there so he can investigate. Once there, Grayson discovers that Sypral's founder (and Luka's father) Otto Netz created Spyral to deal with superhumans but, worrying that the organization would eventually stray from his original plans once he became bored and left, he also founded rival organization Leviathan to challenge them constantly. Wishing to end the cycle of violence, Grayson and Tiger go rogue and begin taking down the other Spyral agents, leading Helena to send the Syndicate, a group of the world's most powerful spies, after them. In response, Dick reaches out to Maxwell Lord and Checkmate to form an alliance.

Armed with Checkmate technology, Grayson and Tiger handily defeat Frankenstein, a member of the Syndicate before taking on Grifter. Dick works out that Grifter is a telepath and uses his training to outsmart him and learning that the Syndicate are only working with Helena so that they can eventually kill her. Grayson tries to send a warning to Helena but, when the Syndicate attack, she believes it to be Dick and Tiger. Helena is gravely wounded before Grayson can get to her and he is forced to fight against the Syndicate while Netz takes her to the medical bay. Agent 8, revealed to be a member of Leviathan, sets off a bomb at Sypral HQ and, after subduing her, Tiger kills his former partner. Dick calls in Midnighter, who single-handedly takes down the entire Syndicate while he goes after Helena, not realizing that Otto Netz has revived himself, killed Luka and taken over Helena's body. While searching for Helena, Tiger reveals himself to have been working for Checkmate all along and he and Grayson fight numerous times while attempting to locate her. Maxwell Lord reveals that he created Minos and he arrives at Sypral HQ to retrieve the identities of the Justice League but the files are deleted before he can get to them. Dick buries Tiger in an avalanche and makes his way to Otto. Grayson convinces Otto to give up Helena's body and take his instead, to which he agrees. Inside his mind, Dick manages to outwit Otto and destroys him. Helena reveals Otto had programmed a Sypral satellite to erase Dick Grayson from existence so that he could fully take over his life but adds that she tweaked it so that, while most of the world would still be unaware of Dick's existence, she and the rest of the Bat Family would remember him. Relishing his new anonymity, Dick returns to being a superhero.

Return to Nightwing
The Spectre gathers Harley Quinn, Green Lantern, Azrael and John Constantine together to investigate the activities of a mysterious man with no face known as Agent 37, asking them to recall their meetings with him. Constantine explains that, while looking into some local disappearances, he came across a nest of vampires who were holding an attractive man captive. The man, who had no face, allowed the vampires to feed on him and, assuming he had been drained and killed, Constantine attacked the nest to gain revenge. Agent 37 suddenly awakens and reveals that his skin was coated in nanobots that he then sets alight killing the vampires before calling for Matron to retrieve him. Azrael notes a similar interaction where Agent 37 helped turn the tide of a war and Harley recounts breaking into a supervillain vault alongside him. Green Lantern describes how Agent 37 helped him destroy a collection of parademons. Each of the group describes 37 with one word: charmer (Constantine), savior (Azrael), gymnast (Quinn) and superhero (Lantern). Spectre asks them who they believe Agent 37 is and they all remember Dick Grayson. The Spectre is revealed to be Dick himself who, uses the nanobots to cause the group to forget all trace of him before reuniting with Helena and heading for the next adventure.

Several months later, Helena leaves Sypral, taking up the identity of Huntress and leaving Tiger in charge. Midnighter gives Dick a piece of technology that allows him to save Damian's life and outwit the Court of Owls. Back in Gotham, Dick discusses his plans with Batman, who believes that now Dick has regained his secret identity, he should spend some time living his life. Dick disagrees, explaining that even under his personas of the Flying Grayson, Robin, Nightwing, Batman and Agent 37, they are all still Dick Grayson. He reiterates his resolve to fight crime and protect the innocent and dons the Nightwing costume once again.

Reception
The series holds an average rating of 8.1 by 301 professional critics on review aggregation website Comic Book Roundup.

A positive review of the first volume by ComicBookWire.com described the series as "a James Bond movie with a superhero flair, which is a very good thing" and adding that "besides the multitude of great plotlines running through this book, there is even more to like about the story as a whole. The spy stuff is campy and Dick is funnier than ever. It adds a comedic element to the series which contrasts perfectly with the seriousness of the situation".

A review of issue six, during which Grayson fights against Midnighter received positive reviews from critics, with Jay Yaws of BatmanNews.com remarking that "what I liked most about it was it was a battle of personalities just as much as a physical confrontation. The dialogue here is excellent, rising above the macho one-liners and grandstanding that is typical of action scenes. Instead, the rapport between the two feels like a genuine rivalry, with past encounters and grievances carrying weight for these men rather than being forgotten footnotes". He also praised the art by Janin and Cox, noting that "Janín's art is as fluid and expressive as always, but what really impresses me are his creative panel layouts.  Everything flows together and feels like there's genuine motion, thanks in no small part to the beautiful coloring from Jeromy Cox", adding that "[Janin and Cox] may be one of the better illustrative teams in the industry right now".

Prints

Issues

Collected editions

See also
 List of DC Comics publications
 List of Batman comics

References

Batman spin-off titles
Dick Grayson